Finley House may refer to:

James Finley House (Patagonia, Arizona), listed on the National Register of Historic Places in Santa Cruz County, Arizona
James Finley House (Chambersburg, Pennsylvania), listed on the National Register of Historic Places in Franklin County, Pennsylvania
Ebenezer Finley House, Buffalo, Ohio
Eugene L. Finley House, Abilene, Texas
Thomas B. Finley House, North Wilkesboro, North Carolina
Thomas B. Finley Law Office, Wilkesboro, North Carolina

See also
James Finley House (disambiguation)